Shan Pui Chung Hau Tsuen is a village in the Shap Pat Heung area of Yuen Long District, Hong Kong

External links
 Delineation of area of existing village Shan Pui Chung Hau (I) (Shap Pat Heung) for election of resident representative (2019 to 2022)
 Delineation of area of existing village Shan Pui Chung Hau (II) (Shap Pat Heung) for election of resident representative (2019 to 2022)

Villages in Yuen Long District, Hong Kong
Shap Pat Heung